Hargrove Pivot Bridge, also known as Old Hargrove Bridge  is a historic swing bridge located at Poplar Bluff, Butler County, Missouri. It crosses the Black River. This bridge has a modified Wichert truss as its center span and a modified Warren pony truss extending on each side of the center truss. The bridge has not been turned since 1942 due to the lack of river traffic in the area.

It was added to the National Register of Historic Places in 1985.

See also
 
 
 
 
 National Register of Historic Places listings in Butler County, Missouri

References

Truss bridges in the United States
Road bridges on the National Register of Historic Places in Missouri
Bridges completed in 1917
National Register of Historic Places in Butler County, Missouri
1917 establishments in Missouri
Swing bridges in the United States
Black River (Arkansas–Missouri)